
This is a list of the National Register of Historic Places listings in eastern Cincinnati, Ohio.

This is intended to be a complete list of the properties and districts on the National Register of Historic Places in eastern Cincinnati, Ohio, United States. Eastern Cincinnati is defined as being all of the city outside of downtown and east of Vine Street.  The locations of National Register properties and districts may be seen in an online map.

There are 284 properties and districts listed on the National Register in Cincinnati, including 12 National Historic Landmarks. Eastern Cincinnati includes 130 of these properties and districts, including 4 National Historic Landmarks; the city's remaining properties and districts are listed elsewhere.  Another property in eastern Cincinnati was once listed but has been removed.

Current listings

|}

Former listing

|}

See also
List of National Historic Landmarks in Ohio
National Register of Historic Places listings in Cincinnati, Ohio

Notes

References

Eastern